This article contains a list of the species of Shield Bugs recorded in Britain.

The total number of species recorded is 46.

Superfamily Pentatomoidea

Family Acanthosomatidae - The Parent Bugs 
Acanthosoma haemorrhoidale — hawthorn shield bug
Cyphostethus tristriatus — juniper shield bug
Elasmostethus interstinctus — birch shield bug
Elasmucha grisea — parent bug
Elasmucha ferrugata - stained shield bug

Family Scutelleridae - The Jewel Bugs 
Eurygaster maura - scarce tortoise bug
Eurygaster testudinaria - tortoise bug
Eurygaster austriaca - graminate shield bug
Odontoscelis fuliginosa - greater streaked shield bug
Odontoscelis lineola - lesser streaked shield bug

Family Cydnidae - The Burrower Bugs 
Legnotus limbosus - bordered shield bug
Legnotus picipes - heath shield bug
Canthophorus impressus - bastard toadflax bug
Tritomegas bicolor (formerly Sehirus bicolor) — pied shield bug
Tritomegas sexmaculatus - Rambur's pied shield bug
Adomerus biguttatus - cow wheat shield bug
Sehirus luctuosus - forget-me-not shield bug
Geotomus punctulatus - Cornish shield bug
Cydnus aterrimus - spurge shield bug

Family Thyreocoridae - The Ebony Bugs 
Thyreocoris scarabaeoides — scarab shield bug

Family Pentatomidae - The Lesser Shield Bugs 
Graphosoma italicum - striped shield bug
Podops inunctus - turtle shield bug
Sciocoris cursitans - sandrunner
Sciocoris sideritidis - ironwort shield bug
Aelia acuminata — bishop's mitre
Carpocoris purpureipennis - black-shouldered shield bug
Dolycoris baccarum — sloe bug/hairy shield bug
Eysarcoris aeneus - New Forest shield bug
Eysarcoris venustissimus; syn. Eysarcoris fabricii - woundwort shield bug
Peribalus strictus; syn. Holcostethus vernalis - vernal shield bug
Neottiglossa pusilla - small grass shield bug
Palomena prasina — green shield bug
Pentatoma rufipes — forest bug
Piezodorus lituratus — gorse shield bug
Eurydema ornatum - red cabbage bug
Eurydema oleracea — cabbage bug
Eurydema dominulus - scarlet shieldbug
Picromerus bidens - spiny shieldbug
Rhacognathus punctatus — heather bug
Troilus luridus - bronze shield bug
Zicrona caerulea — blue shield bug
Nezara viridula — southern green stink bug
Dyroderes umbraculatus - white-shouldered shield bug
Jalla dumosa - Jalla's shield bug
Byrsinus flavicornis - burrower shield bug
Chlorochroa juniperina (Extinct)

References 

Shield bugs, Britain
Shield bugs
Shield bugs